A Shot at Love II with Tila Tequila is an American reality television dating game show. It is the follow-up season to A Shot at Love with Tila Tequila. The series is a bisexual-themed dating competition where 15 hetero males and 15 lesbian females live in a house with Tila Tequila and compete for her attention and affection. The contestants, unlike in Season 1, are aware of Tequila's bisexuality. The winner of this season was contestant Kristy Morgan, who declined her "shot at love", stating she was not ready for a relationship with a woman.

A spin-off of the series entitled A Double Shot at Love featuring the bisexual "ikki twins" premiered on December 9, 2008. Tequila had previously confirmed on her official website that she would not be a part of the show's third season, but will instead be featured in a show focusing on her daily life.

Episodes

Contestants
The following table lists the roster of contestants for each episode, ordered based on Tequila's call-out order.

Contestants surviving elimination in the first episode are arranged alphabetically, while eliminated contestants are arranged based on the order Tequila announced that their shot at love had ended, with the first eliminated listed at the bottom. Surviving women are listed before the men as they were invited to stay in the house first.
1 Samantha eventually started being called by her nickname, "Glitter."
 The contestant was eliminated.
 The contestant won a date with Tequila.
 The contestant won a date with Tequila, but was eliminated.
 The contestant was removed from the competition due to violence.
 The contestant was previously eliminated but was brought back into the competition.
 The contestant was given a key before the elimination ceremony.
 The contestant was offered the final key at the final elimination, but ultimately refused it.

Eliminations
The following table explains Tequila's published reasons for eliminating contestants.
 Some reasons were not stated in the episode in which they aired.

Final elimination leaked
Before the final episode aired, an MSNBC report inadvertently leaked that Tequila would not actually find love. In the MSNBC report, which was published 18 days before the final elimination, it stated "[Tequila] won't fall in love with a man or a woman" followed by Tequila saying, "I am going to Africa. I think maybe I will fall in love in Africa."

References

External links
 
 

2008 American television series debuts
2000s American reality television series
2008 American television series endings
Bisexuality-related television series
American dating and relationship reality television series
American LGBT-related reality television series
MTV game shows
2000s LGBT-related reality television series